Marie Josephine Marguerite Blais (born September 12, 1950) is a Canadian politician, journalist, radio host and television host from Quebec. She is currently a Coalition Avenir Québec Member of the National Assembly of Québec and is the current Minister Responsible for Seniors and Informal Caregivers and Member of the Comité ministériel des services aux citoyens since October 2018. She was a Liberal Member of the National Assembly of Quebec for the electoral division of Saint-Henri–Sainte-Anne in Montreal from 2007 to 2015, and served as the Minister responsible for Seniors, vice-chair of the Comité ministériel du développement social, éducatif et culturel and member of the Conseil du trésor.

Biography
Blais did graduate studies in piano and organ at the Conservatoire de musique du Québec. After a few years spent teaching music to kindergarten students (1968–1971), she entered the world of communications, acquiring a master's degree (Université du Québec à Montréal, 1997), a doctorate (Université du Québec à Montréal, Université de Montréal and Concordia University, 2005) and a postdoctorate (Université du Québec à Montréal, 2008). She has some thirty years’ experience as a radio and television host and journalist (1971–2002).

From 1996 to 2003, Blais was the director general of the Fondation du maire de Montréal pour la jeunesse. She was president of the Conseil de la famille et de l’enfance (2003-2007). She joined a number of charitable organizations (Centraide, Little Brothers of the Poor, World Vision for Africa) and worked within a number of groups that assist young people, the elderly and the underprivileged in our society, with a particular focus on the deaf community and persons with hearing disabilities.

She was elected in 2007, and was re-elected in 2008, 2012 and 2014.

She announced her resignation from the legislature in August 2015, several months after the death of her husband. On May 8, 2018, she was rumored to come back into politics under the Coalition Avenir Québec, opposing her former party. She ran in the 2018 election in the riding of Prévost and won.

Publications
 Author - Quand les Sourds nous font signe : histoires de sourds, éditions Dauphin Blanc (2003)
 Author - La culture sourde : Quête identitaires au coeur de la communication, Les Presses de l'Université Laval, collection Sociologie au coin de la Rue (2006)
 Co-Author - Apprendre à vivre aux frontières des cultures sourdes et entendantes, Les Presses de l'Université Laval, co-auteur monsieur Jacques Rhéaume  (2009)

References

External links

1950 births
Living people
Women government ministers of Canada
Canadian women journalists
Journalists from Montreal
Members of the Executive Council of Quebec
Politicians from Montreal
Writers from Montreal
Quebec Liberal Party MNAs
Université du Québec à Montréal alumni
Women MNAs in Quebec
21st-century Canadian women politicians
Coalition Avenir Québec MNAs
Canadian women non-fiction writers